Frederick Bates (June 23, 1777 – August 4, 1825), was an American attorney and politician. He was elected in 1824 as the second governor of Missouri and died in office in 1825. Before that he had served as a justice of the Territorial Supreme Court for Michigan Territory, was appointed by Thomas Jefferson as Secretary of the Louisiana Territory and started to build his political base in St. Louis.

Early life and education
Born in 1777 into the planter class in Goochland County, Virginia, Bates was schooled privately at his family's Belmont plantation by tutors. Later he went to college and read the law with an established firm.  He settled in Detroit in 1797 and became its first postmaster in 1803. He was a member of the Bates family along with his brothers Edward and James Woodson Bates.

Career
After working as an attorney, Bates started his political career when appointed as a justice of the Territorial Supreme Court for Michigan Territory in Detroit, Michigan.  He received a significant promotion when the Aaron Burr conspiracy was uncovered. In February 1807, while Bates was in Washington, President Thomas Jefferson appointed him to be Secretary of the Louisiana Territory, as well as a recorder of land titles. He held this position in St. Louis until 1812. Bates helped determine whether conflicting French, Spanish, and American land claims in the territory would be upheld, as it had been subject to three differing political systems.

Jefferson had already decided on the returning explorer and fellow Virginian Meriwether Lewis as governor of the huge new Louisiana Territory, which approximately equaled the size of the existing United States.  Bates preceded Lewis to St. Louis and became a powerful political force in the new territory; he was a political rival of Lewis until the latter's death while traveling from St. Louis to Washington on business in 1809. Later, as Secretary of the newly formed Missouri Territory (1812–1821), he became acting governor in the frequent absences of Territorial Governor William Clark.

In the August 1824 election, Bates was elected the second governor of Missouri.  He died in office in August 1825 in Chesterfield, Missouri, due to a short illness thought to be pneumonia. Bates was buried at the family cemetery on the Thornhill estate near St. Louis.

Marriage and family

In 1819, Bates married Nancy Opie Ball (1802–1877), daughter of a wealthy Virginia colonel. The couple had four children, Emily Caroline (1820–1891), Lucius Lee (1821–1898), Woodville (1823–1840) and Frederick Jr. (1826–1862).

During his time in Missouri, Bates acquired nearly 1000 acres (4 km2) of land, which he called Thornhill. He had built a Federal-style home with high ceilings for summer ventilation, fine woodwork and a sophisticated floor plan; all this would have been familiar to Bates from his childhood home, Belmont, in Goochland County, Virginia. The Thornhill estate still exists today and can be viewed by the public. It is located in Faust County Park in Chesterfield, Missouri.

Legacy and honors
Governor Bates is the namesake of Bates County, Missouri.

References

External links

National Governors Association profile

1777 births
1825 deaths
People from Loudoun County, Virginia
Missouri Democratic-Republicans
Missouri Territory officials
Governors of Missouri
Michigan postmasters
People from St. Louis County, Missouri
Justices of the Michigan Supreme Court
Democratic-Republican Party state governors of the United States
19th-century American judges
19th-century American lawyers